David Lance Cornwell (June 14, 1945 – November 2, 2012) was an American Vietnam War veteran who served one term as a U.S. Representative from Indiana from 1977 to 1979.

Early life and career
Born in Paoli, Indiana, Cornwell attended Paoli public schools, Culver Military Academy in Indiana and later Phillips Andover Academy in Massachusetts. In 1964, Cornwell graduated from Park High School, Indianapolis, Indiana. The same year, he attended Hillsdale College and then American College of Monaco in 1969. Cornwell enrolled in the Indiana University in 1974.

He also worked as secretary for the Board of Directors of Cornwell Co., Inc. in Paoli.

Vietnam War
In the years 1966 to 1968, he served in the United States Army in Vietnam.

Congress 
Although an unsuccessful candidate for nomination in 1974 to the Ninety-fourth Congress, Cornwell was elected as a Democrat to the Ninety-fifth Congress, representing Indiana's 8th congressional district. He served from January 3, 1977, to January 3, 1979, and was an unsuccessful candidate for reelection in 1978.

In Congress, he served on the Committee on Veterans Affairs, where he focused much of his attention on issues related to servicemen and women who had served in the Vietnam War.

Later career and death 
After he left Congress, Cornwell worked in the Department of Labor, before entering the private sector as a governmental and international relations consultant, as well as business pursuits.

He was a resident of Annapolis, Maryland at the time of his death from kidney cancer in 2012.

References

External links

1945 births
2012 deaths
Indiana University alumni
Hillsdale College alumni
People from Paoli, Indiana
United States Army soldiers
United States Army personnel of the Vietnam War
Democratic Party members of the United States House of Representatives from Indiana
Politicians from Annapolis, Maryland
20th-century American politicians
Culver Academies alumni
Phillips Academy alumni